Denny Gigliotti (born 20 July 1991) is an Italian footballer who plays as a midfielder for Forlì.

Club career

Catanzaro
He made his full debut for Catanzaro against Sorrento on 8 August 2010 in a 6-0 loss. He came on as a sub against Isola Liri in the 71st minute and scored the 4th goal in the 87th minute in a 5–0 home win.

Virtus Francavilla
On 25 January 2019, he joined Virtus Francavilla on loan. On 13 July 2019, he moved to Virtus Francavilla on a permanent basis.

Serie D
On 27 December 2020 he signed with Forlì.

References

1991 births
Sportspeople from the Province of Catanzaro
Footballers from Calabria
Living people
Italian footballers
Association football defenders
U.S. Catanzaro 1929 players
A.S.D. Città di Marino Calcio players
Virtus Francavilla Calcio players
Forlì F.C. players
Serie C players
Serie D players